"Daremo Shiranai" (誰も知らない, "Nobody Knows") is a Japanese-language song and the 44th single released by Japanese boy band Arashi. "Daremo Shiranai" was used as the theme song for the drama Shinigami-kun starring Arashi member Satoshi Ohno. It reached number one on the Oricon Singles Chart and was the 12th best-selling single of the year in Japan, with 525,055 copies sold.

Single information
The single was released in two editions: a limited edition including a bonus track and a bonus DVD with a music video for "Daremo Shiranai", and a regular CD only edition including two bonus tracks and karaoke tracks for all the songs. The limited edition also contains a 16-page booklet.

Track listing

See also
 List of Oricon number-one singles of 2014

References

External links
 Single information 

2014 singles
2014 songs
Arashi songs
J Storm singles
Oricon Weekly number-one singles
Songs written by Christofer Erixon